Emil Frost Holten (born 8 August 1996) is a Danish professional footballer who plays as a forward for Danish 2nd Division club Esbjerg fB.

References

Living people
1996 births
Association football forwards
Danish men's footballers
Akademisk Boldklub players
Nykøbing FC players
Silkeborg IF players
Esbjerg fB players
Danish Superliga players
Lyngby Boldklub players
Danish 1st Division players
Danish 2nd Division players
People from Lyngby-Taarbæk Municipality
Sportspeople from the Capital Region of Denmark